The Sobieski is a EuroCity (EC) international express train.  Introduced in 1994, it runs between Vienna, the capital of Austria, and Warsaw, the capital of Poland, via the Czech Republic.

The train's name honours the Sobieski family, or the House of Sobieski, a notable family of Polish nobility.

, the northbound train departs at shortly after 07:00 and the southbound train at shortly after midday.  Both trains arrive at their destinations after a journey time of approximately eight and a half hours.

See also

 History of rail transport in Austria
 History of rail transport in the Czech Republic
 History of rail transport in Poland
 List of EuroCity services
 List of named passenger trains of Europe

References

EuroCity
International named passenger trains
Named passenger trains of Austria
Named passenger trains of the Czech Republic
Named passenger trains of Poland
Railway services introduced in 1994